Nari , is a village and one of the 51 Union Councils (administrative subdivisions) of Khushab District in the Punjab Province of Pakistan.  It is located at 32°28'4N 72°24'32E

Nari has been divided in two regions—Nari Janubi and Nari shumali. It has a population approximately 20000 persons with a Govt higher secondary school and a Basic health unit.
The village has three private schools. Osama Public School is the biggest private institution in the village. it has big 20 masjids.

References 

Union councils of Khushab District
Populated places in Khushab District